Neelofar Abbasi (née Aleem) is a Pakistani actress. She is known for her roles in dramas Happy Eid Mubarak, Khumaar Zeher Alood, Aroosa, Naya Raasta and Eid Ka Jora. Neelofar is best known for her role in drama  Shehzori as Tara.

Early life
Neelofar was born on 1955, August 9th in Karachi, Pakistan. Neelofar was interested in arts and literature from a young age. Neelofar's father Aleemuddin was a writer for newspapers and her mother Noon was a radio artist. In first grade she used to read Shaukat Siddiqui's books including the famous book Khuda Ki Basti and soon after she began to read books of Krishan Chander and Ismat Chughtai. Neelofar got interested in Radio Shows and wanted to host her own shows. 

Neelofar's mother was a radio artist tried to enter into Radio through her mother but her mother opposed it and wanted Neelofar to give audition. Neelofar studied science subjects at D.J Science college and went to University of Karachi there she completed her studies from University of Karachi and graduated with masters in mircrobiology.

Career
Neelofar was fourteen and she was taking a class of Hashim Jalali the elder brother of Qasim Jalil, he realized her potential towards radio and acting. He encouraged Neelofar towards radio and he insisted Neelofar to audition for a Radio Show. Neelofar didn't want to miss her chance and she auditioned for the position for which she was selected by the judges. Neelofar first drama was on Radio. Neelofar was in school and also doing radio work at that time she got inspired by radio artists Talat Hussain and Sajida Syed.

Then Neelofar did Radio for Karachi and stage plays which were written by her parents. While still in College Neelofar did an audition for Jashn-e-talaba and she was selected by the judges and earned her a fame there radio director Yawar Mehdi trained Neelofar on various radio programs, including voiceover. Neelofar was noted for friendly face, appearances and highly refined etiquette.

In 1970 Neelofar was awarded Tyfon Award by cricketer Hanif Mohammad for her contribution towards radio and television. 

During 1970s Neelofar begin to host Subah-e-Nau a Daily Morning Show on Radio Pakistan, she interviewed various actors and singers including Jamiluddin Aali and Nanha the show was a success and ran for almost two decades from 1970s to 1980s. 

In 1974 Neelofar became popular when she portrayed the role of Tara in drama Shehzori which was written by Haseena Moin. Neelofar's acting was praised by actor Shakeel with whom she worked in many dramas. The role of Tara was breakthrough for Neelofar and she became popular in the country and that attracted the attention of politician Nusrat Bhutto who loved Neelofar's acting in Shehzori and became fond of Neelofar. 

In 1991 Neelofar left acting for a brief time and she moved abroad to America with her husband Qamar. There she began to write for Good Morning Pakistan.

In 1992 she returned to acting and appeared in some dramas and in 1994 she appeared in drama Aroosa which was written by Fatima Surayya Bajia on PTV.

In 2014 she appeared in drama Jackson Heights on Urdu 1 and the same year she got Lifetime Achievement Award by Arts Council of Pakistan Karachi for her contribution towards the television industry.

The following year in 2015 Neelofar received the Women of Inspiration Award from Minister Tariq Fazal Chaudhry presented by Wonder Women Association of Pakistan for her contribution towards the radio and television industry.

Personal life
Neelofar married writer and producer Qamar Ali Abbasi in 1975 and Nusrat Bhutto was a guest at their wedding. Later Nurast Bhutto invited Neelofar and her husband Qamar for dinner at the PM House. They had three children a son named Wajahat and two daughters named Maria and Sobia. Qamar Abbasi died in June 1, 2013.

Filmography

Television

Telefilm

Awards and recognition

Bibliography
Neelofar authored a critically book titled Kahi Ankahi also a memoir about her life and in memory of her parents. She wrote about her experience as a radio artist and television actress. Neelofar also wrote about actors and actresses with whom she had worked.

References

External links
 

1955 births
Living people
20th-century Pakistani actresses
Pakistani television actresses
21st-century Pakistani actresses
Pakistani film actresses